The British Freediving Association (BFA, also known as AIDA-UK) is an organisation established in the United Kingdom during 1999 to promote the safe practice of both competition and recreational freediving.   It is the British affiliate of AIDA International. The BFA is the sole body that selects teams for international competitions conducted by AIDA International and ratifies any UK record attempts.

The British Freediving Association organises UK Freediving pool and depth competitions every year. The Great Northern pool competition was hosted by ApneistsUK who have hosted the Pool Championships in 2010, 2011, 2012, 2013 and 2014. The last depth competition was 2012.

See also

References

External links
The official British Record Holder Michael Board profile (102 meters in CWF)
The official BFA homepage
The official BFA Forums
Associate members

Sports organisations of the United Kingdom
1999 establishments in the United Kingdom
Sports organizations established in 1999
Underwater sports organizations
Freediving
Underwater sport in the United Kingdom
Diver organizations